Horney is a surname. Notable people with the surname include:

 Amanda Horney (1857–1953), Swedish politician
 Brigitte Horney (1911–1988), German actress
 Jane Horney (1918–1945), Swedish woman, believed to have spied in Denmark for the benefit of Nazi Germany
 Karen Horney (1885–1952), German psychoanalyst
 Marianne Horney Eckardt (1913–2018), German-born American psychoanalyst, translator and editor
 Odus Creamer Horney (1866–1957), American officer

See also
 City of Norwood v. Horney
 Horney Bluff, Antarctica
 Horney Dicks, a nickname for the Londonderry Borough Police
 Horney Robinson House, Indiana, United States
 Horny (disambiguation)
 Lake Horney, Florida, United States